Guillem Jaime Serrano (born ; Tarragona) is a Spanish professional footballer who plays as a right-back for Primera Federación club Intercity.

Club career
Born in Tarragona, Catalonia, Jaime joined FC Barcelona's La Masia in 2007, from CDC Torreforta. On 9 July 2018, he renewed his contract until 2020, with a release clause of €1 million, and was promoted to the reserves in Segunda División B.

Jaime made his senior debut on 9 September 2018, starting in a 1–0 away win against CE Sabadell FC. His first goal occurred roughly one year later, in a 2–2 home draw against Gimnàstic de Tarragona.

Jaime left Barça on 30 June 2020, as his contract expired, and signed a two-year deal with Segunda División newcomers CD Castellón on 28 August. He made his professional debut on 24 October, starting in a 0–1 home loss against Girona FC.

On 1 February 2021, Jaime was loaned to third division side Gimnàstic de Tarragona for the remainder of the season. On 17 August, he returned to Barcelona and its B-team, now in the newly-created Primera División RFEF, on a one-year contract. 

On 13 July 2022, Jaime agreed to a two-year deal with CF Intercity in the third division.

Career statistics

Club

Honours

Club 
Barcelona
UEFA Youth League: 2017–18

References

External links

1999 births
Living people
Sportspeople from Tarragona
Spanish footballers
Footballers from Catalonia
Association football defenders
Segunda División players
Primera Federación players
Segunda División B players
FC Barcelona Atlètic players
CD Castellón footballers
Gimnàstic de Tarragona footballers
CF Intercity players
Spain youth international footballers